This is a list of members of the Victorian Legislative Council from the elections of 2 September – 3 October 1864 to the elections of 31 August – 2 October 1866.

There were six Electoral Provinces and five members elected to each Province.

Note the "Term in Office" refers to that members term(s) in the Council, not necessarily for that Province.

 Hervey resigned in July 1863, replaced by William Haines in an August 1865 by-election. Haines died on 3 February 1866 and was replaced by Robert Stirling Hore Anderson in March 1866.

References

 Re-member (a database of all Victorian MPs since 1851). Parliament of Victoria.

Members of the Parliament of Victoria by term
19th-century Australian politicians